Manuelcha Prado (born 10 June 1955) is a guitarist, singer, composer, compiler and troubadour of Andean music. He is also known by many people as "The Saqra of the Guitar".

Albums 
1981: Guitarra Indígena
1985: Testimonio Ayacuchano
1987: Guitarra y Canto del Ande
1992: Sixtucha&Manuelcha Prado
1994: 25 Aniversario
2000: Saqra
2003: El Solterito
2003: Poesía Quechua
2007: Madre Andina
2012: Vidallay Vida

References

External links
 Official website
 World Routes in Peru, The music of Ayacucho
 Event
 Perfil

Living people
20th-century Peruvian male singers
20th-century Peruvian singers
Peruvian guitarists
Male guitarists
1955 births
21st-century Peruvian male singers
21st-century Peruvian singers